Mokrani is a surname, and may refer to;

Mokrani derives from المقراني (El Mokrani), a town in Algeria.

 Cheikh Mokrani (1815–1871) - Leader of the Mokrani Revolt
 Mohamed Mokrani (born 1981) - Algerian handball player

References

Arabic-language surnames
Surnames of Algerian origin